Small Dead Animals (SDA) is a Canadian blog, focusing largely on politics (Canadian, U.S., British and international) from a conservative perspective. Saskatchewan-based blogger Kate McMillan founded the blog and remains its primary contributor.

The main page of Small Dead Animals carries this message: 
Why this blog?Until this moment I have been forced to listen while media and politicians alike have told me "what Canadians think". In all that time they never once asked.
This is just the voice of an ordinary Canadian yelling back at the radio - "You don't speak for me."

Small Dead Animals was voted Best Canadian Blog in the Weblog Awards for 2004, 2005, 2006 and 2007.
In 2008, SDA was narrowly voted Best Conservative Blog in North America over Ace of Spades HQ.

Defamation
In 2008, human rights lawyer Richard Warman sued McMillan, Ezra Levant, Kathy Shaidle and the National Post over links to comments criticizing him at a Canadian internet forum, freedominion.ca. The National Post settled with Warman soon after the suit was launched and, in June 2015, Shaidle, Levant and McMillan all settled in exchange for undisclosed amounts and the issuance of public retractions and apologies. McMillan posted the following apology on her blog:

Memorable phrases

The Libranos
McMillan coined the phrase "The Libranos" (a play on "liberal" and "Sopranos") to refer to the Liberal Party of Canada in light of the sponsorship scandal.
A year later, a photograph of two Conservative MPs with a poster-sized version of a Western Standard cover based on her concept
sparked a national controversy when Joe Volpe likened the MPs to Ku Klux Klan members.

Coverage in media

Small Dead Animals has received some press coverage from the Toronto Sun, including:

 Publishing a letter from a soldier's widow after he died in a training exercise and the media became intrusive during and before the funeral.
 Commenting negatively on Alberta Progressive Conservative premier Ralph Klein's slide to the left.
 Criticizing a no-jail sentence for Paul Coffin, who was involved in the sponsorship scandal.
 Noting Celine Dion's choice of pronouns when discussing Hurricane Katrina on Larry King Live.

McMillan and some other Canadian bloggers provided commentary on the 2006 Canadian elections to the CBC
and BBC News.
SDA and McMillan have been mentioned on the floor of the Legislative Assembly of Saskatchewan.

References

External links 
Small Dead Animals weblog

Canadian political websites
Canadian bloggers
Conservative media in Canada